Olenecamptus octopustulatus is a species of beetle in the family Cerambycidae. It was described by Victor Motschulsky in 1860, originally under the genus Ibidiomorphum. It is known from Mongolia.

References

Dorcaschematini
Beetles described in 1860